Adalbert Dickhut (16 May 1923 – 5 April 1995) was a German gymnast. He competed at the 1952 Summer Olympics in all artistic gymnastics events and finished fourth with the German team. His best individual achievement was ninth place on the vault. He won this event at the 1955 European Men's Artistic Gymnastics Championships.

References

1923 births
1995 deaths
German male artistic gymnasts
Sportspeople from Dortmund
Gymnasts at the 1952 Summer Olympics
Olympic gymnasts of West Germany
20th-century German people